Pyrausta nigrimaculata is a moth in the family Crambidae. It was described by Yang-Seop Bae and Yong-Ki Kim in 2002. It is found in Korea.

The wingspan is 19–21 mm. The ground colour of the wings is dark fuscous brown, with a large yellowish marking on the postmedial area of the forewing. There is a yellowish band on the hindwings.

Etymology
The species name refers to the extremely blackish wing.

References

Moths described in 2002
nigrimaculata
Moths of Korea